Denton Castle is a motte and bailey castle built in the village of Denton, Norfolk, England.

History

Denton Castle was built after 1088, following the Norman invasion of England, probably by William d'Albini, who linked his estate at Denton to that at Buckenham, where he also built a castle. The motte is around 150 feet in diameter, surrounded by a protective ditch, with an adjacent, horseshoe-shaped bailey. The castle may have been destroyed around 1254.

Today the castle is a scheduled monument. It was purchased by the National Trust in 1990 and forms part of the Trust's Darrow Wood pasture.

See also
Castles in Great Britain and Ireland
List of castles in England

References

Bibliography
 Manning, C.R. (1884) "Earthworks at the Castle-Hill, Darrow Wood, Denton, Norfolk," Norfolk Archaeology 9, pp. 335–342.

External links
Bibliography of sources related to Denton Castle

Castles in Norfolk
Denton, Norfolk